Allente is a Nordic TV distributor that offers TV solutions via satellite TV and IPTV, to 1.2 million customers in Denmark, Finland, Norway and Sweden. In addition, the company offers streaming services, as well as IPTV solutions and fiber broadband via open networks. The company was established on 5 May 2020, as a result of a merger between Canal Digital and Viasat Consumer. The merger was planned the year before, but was only approved by the EU on that date. The company is owned 50/50 by Telenor Group (which owned Canal Digital) and Nordic Entertainment Group, now Viaplay Group, (which owned Viasat).

The company is headquartered in Oslo and Stockholm.

The CEO of Allente is Jonas Gustafsson.

References

External links
Allente Danmark
Allente Suomi
Allente Norge
Allente Sverige

Cable television companies of Norway
Cable television companies
Companies based in Oslo
Direct broadcast satellite services
Internet service providers of Norway
Mass media companies established in 2020
Nordic Entertainment Group
Telenor
Television broadcasting companies of Norway
Television in Denmark
Television in Finland
Television in Sweden
Television networks in Sweden